William Clayton (after 1650 – 7 July 1715) was an English merchant and politician from Liverpool.

He was the son of Robert Clayton of Fulwood, near Preston, Lancashire and followed his uncle Thomas Clayton to Liverpool, where he became a successful tobacco and sugar merchant. After serving as a common councillor from 1685 he was elected Mayor of Liverpool for 1689–90, and then became an alderman of the city.

In the Parliament of England, he served as a Member of Parliament (MP) for Liverpool from 1698 to 1708.  After the Union with Scotland, he was elected as a Liverpool MP to the new House of Commons of Great Britain from 1713 to 1715.

He married, in 1690, Elizabeth, the daughter of George Leigh of Oughtrington, Cheshire and left a son and 3 daughters.

References 
 

1650s births
Year of birth uncertain
1715 deaths
Politicians from Preston, Lancashire
Businesspeople from Liverpool
Mayors of Liverpool
English MPs 1698–1700
English MPs 1701
English MPs 1701–1702
English MPs 1702–1705
English MPs 1705–1707
Members of the Parliament of Great Britain for Liverpool
British MPs 1713–1715
Members of the Parliament of England (pre-1707) for Liverpool